Skew Peak is a mountain, 2,535 m, just west of the head of Frazier Glacier, in the Clare Range of Victoria Land. So named in 1957 by the Northern Survey Party of the Commonwealth Trans-Antarctic Expedition (1956–58) because the summit is notably asymmetrical from all directions. Springtail Point lies 3 nautical miles (6 km) to the north.

Mountains of Victoria Land
Scott Coast